Thomas Medwin (20 March 1788 –2 August 1869) was an early 19th-century English writer, poet and translator. He is known chiefly for his biography of his cousin, Percy Bysshe Shelley, and for published recollections of his friend, Lord Byron.

Early life
Thomas Medwin was born in the market town of Horsham, West Sussex on 20 March 1788, the third son of five children of Thomas Charles Medwin, a solicitor and steward, and Mary Medwin (née Pilford). His two older brothers John and Henry died in early adulthood. 
He was a second cousin on both his parents' sides to Percy Bysshe Shelley (1792–1822), who lived two miles away at Field Place, Warnham, and with whom Medwin formed a friendship from childhood onwards.

Medwin was from a prosperous rather than a wealthy family that expected their sons to work for a living. He attended Syon House Academy in Isleworth in 1788–1804, as did Shelley in 1802–1808. Medwin related that Shelley and he remained close friends at Syon House, forming a bond so close that Shelley apparently sleepwalked his way to Medwin's dormitory. After a further year in a public school, Medwin matriculated at University College, Oxford in the winter of 1805, but left without taking his degree. He was initially articled as a clerk in his father's law firm in Horsham.

Medwin showed aptitude in foreign languages and was to become fluent in Greek, Latin, German, Italian, Spanish, French and Portuguese. He began writing poems, including a contribution to The Wandering Jew, a poem attributed to Shelley. The young Shelley and Medwin met during their respective holidays for pursuits such as fishing and fox-hunting. Their romantic attachments included their cousin Harriet Grove, with whom Shelley was deeply committed by the spring of 1810, although he was to elope with Harriet Westbrook in 1811 using money he had borrowed under false pretences from Medwin senior.

Medwin rebelled against his father's wish for him to become a lawyer, running up gambling debts and causing a quarrel with his father, the result of which was the omission of Thomas from his father's will, executed in 1829. Considerable debts appear to have been paid by his family. His activities involved much carousing and gambling at his club in Brighton and spending money on collecting art. Shelley recalled Medwin as painting well and "remarkable, if I do not mistake, for a particular taste in, and knowledge of the belli arti – Italy is the place for you, the very place – the Paradise of Exiles.... If you will be glad to see an old friend, who will be glad to see you... come to Italy." Medwin's financial situation could not continue as it was, and by 1812 he had accepted a military commission in the 24th Light Dragoons, a regiment where he could pursue his social pretensions.

India
Although he had no military training, Medwin was gazetted as a cornet in June 1812, joining his regiment at Cawnpore in Uttar Pradesh in northern India shortly thereafter. Cawnpore, far removed from the scene of the Gurkha or Nepal War of 1814–16, in which Medwin's regiment did not participate, was amongst the largest military stations in India, with an organised social life and stores stocked with European goods.

The heat was stultifying and few duties were required of an officer. Judging from Medwin's description, he spent many enthusiastic hours hunting wildlife. He saw action rarely, but was present at the siege of Hathras in 1817 and involved in advances against the Pindaris on the banks of the river Sindh in December 1817. He witnessed at least one incident of sati, the ritual burning of a widow, on the Narmuda river in 1818. He enthusiastically toured the classical Hindu temples of Gaur, Palibothra, Jagannath and Karla, and the Elephanta and Ellora Caves. Medwin may have had an affair with a Hindu woman that ended badly, but through whom he was introduced to the doctrines of Rammohan Roy.
Medwin proved a competent, rather than a commendable soldier. He suffered from dysentery, which recurred at intervals during his life.

While waiting in Bombay for a berth back to England in October 1818, he rediscovered on a bookstall the poetry of his cousin Shelley, in a copy of  The Revolt of Islam. Shelley was to provide the central experience and focal point of his literary life. Recalling the incident under his persona Julian in The Angler in Wales in 1834, he was "astonished at the greatness of (Shelley's) genius" and declared that "the amiable philosophy and self-sacrifice inculcated by that divine poem, worked a strange reformation in my mind." Medwin's sobriquet Julian is likely to have been a reference to Shelley's Julian and Maddolo, a poem in which Julian has characteristics of Shelley.

Medwin's regiment was disbanded at the end of 1818 and Medwin went on half-pay, attached to a regiment of the Life Guards until 1831, when he sold his commission. He was by this time known as Captain Medwin, although there is no evidence that he was ever promoted beyond the rank of lieutenant.

Reunion with Shelley

In September 1820 he arrived in Geneva to stay with Jane and Edward Ellerker Williams, the latter of whom was to drown with Shelley. There he finished his first published poem, Oswald and Edwin, An Oriental Sketch, dedicated to Williams. This ran to 40 pages with 12 pages of notes. It was revised in 1821 as the Lion Hunt for Sketches From Hindoostan.

In the autumn of 1820, Medwin joined his cousin Shelley in Pisa, moving in with him and his wife Mary Shelley, with whom he was to develop an uneasy relationship. Medwin was periodically ill during his months in Pisa but worked with Shelley on a number of poems and on the publication of his journal Sketches From Hindoostan. Shelley and Medwin started to study Arabic together. They also read Schiller, Cervantes, Milton and Petrarch, and throughout early 1821 pursued a vigorous intellectual life. Shelley was working on Prometheus and would read drafts each evening to Medwin, who was continuing with a second volume of Oswald and Edwin, An Oriental Sketch. In January they were joined by Jane and Edward Ellerker Williams. Medwin left Shelley in March 1821 to visit Florence, Rome and then Venice, where he continued to write and socialise. In November 1821 he returned to Pisa.

Meeting with Byron

Shelley introduced Medwin to Lord Byron on 20 November 1821.  Byron and Medwin were to form a  friendship. They enjoyed the company of various women, as can be seen by their correspondence with each other, and formed a male bond that was missing from Medwin's relationship with Shelley. He joined Byron for episodes of pistol shooting and riding and dined within Byron's inner circle with other friends that included Shelley, Edward E Williams, Leigh Hunt and the recently arrived Edward John Trelawny. The last would feature as friend and rival throughout Medwin's life, as both sought to be arbiters of Byron's reputation. Medwin provided a translation of part of Petrarch's "Africa" for Byron, while Byron finished Cantos 6–12 of Don Juan. When Medwin decided to continue his tour of Italy in April 1822, Byron insisted on holding a splendid leaving party for him.

Death of Shelley
The impecunious Medwin travelled first to Rome, where he was introduced to the sculptor Antonio Canova, and then to Naples, before sailing to Genoa. It was at Genoa that he heard a rumour of an English schooner being lost with two Englishman aboard, but only on his arrival in Geneva did he learn that it was Shelley and Edward Williams, who had drowned on 8 July 1822. Medwin was devastated and returned to Italy, where he learned at Spezia that his friends' bodies had been thrown up out of the sea. He arrived in Pisa on 18 August, a few hours after the bodies had been cremated. Throughout the rest of his life, he was bitter about being late, even claiming at one time that he had been present. He met the widows and his friends Byron, Trelawny and Leigh Hunt, who were present at Shelley's cremation, and he put the horror of those days into "Ahasuerus, The Wanderer", a poetic tribute, dedicated to Byron and laid at the feet of the dead Shelley. A melancholic Medwin left Pisa shortly after to visit Genoa, Geneva, Paris, and finally London.

Controversy over Byron
The restless Medwin moved to Paris in 1824, where he met Washington Irving, an American author who shared his enthusiasm for Byron and the Spanish poets, particularly Calderón. A lasting correspondence was formed. Shortly afterwards Medwin learned of the death of Lord Byron on 19 April 1824. The news was published in London on 15 May, and by 10 July Medwin had compiled a volume, his Conversations of Lord Byron. The manuscript received short shrift from Mary Shelley and many other critics. John Galt and William Harness published negative appraisals in the November Blackwood's Magazine, and John Cam Hobhouse wrote a withering assault on Medwin for the Westminster Review of January 1825, questioning the truth of much of the book's contents. Lady Caroline Lamb, one of Byron's mistresses, was deeply upset by Medwin's comments and wrote him letters putting her view of their affair to him. John Murray (1778–1843), the Scottish publisher whose family house owned the copyright to Byron's works, was also outraged at the revelations and threatened to sue. (Murray had destroyed Byron's memoirs as being unfit for publication.)

However supporters of Medwin's book included several eminent writers, including Sir Samuel Egerton Brydges, who included in his edition of Edward Phillips' Theatrum Petarum Anglicanorum a memoir of Shelley, written by Medwin. Leigh Hunt, as might be expected, took a more tolerant view of Medwin in Lord Byron and his Contemporaries (1828), and since the publication of Byron's letters in Thomas Moore's biography(1830/31) and Lady Blessington's Conversations (1832–1833), Medwin's recollections of Byron have come to be seen as not always faithful in detail, but essentially an accurate portrayal. There were at least twelve impressions in the United States, and it was published in Germany, France and Italy. It remains in print to this day. Captain Medwin was by then famous (or infamous), well-off, and able to marry Anne Henrietta Hamilton, Countess of Starnford (a Swedish title), on 2 November 1824 in Lausanne.

High life and downfall
Medwin was 36 when he married and took a long honeymoon at Vevey before settling in Florence. The union produced two daughters, Henrietta and Catherine. Medwin settled into a life of style and substance among an English émigré community. Unfortunately he was still living beyond his means and lost large sums buying and selling Italian art works. By 1829, when his father died, he was in dire financial straits, with creditors repossessing his goods. His marriage came under strain, and Medwin  abandoned his wife and two daughters, leaving friends such as Trelawny and Charles Armitage Brown to sort out his and his wife's affairs.Many of his debts were subsequently paid off by his long suffering brother Pilford Medwin. 

Medwin moved to Genoa, where he worked assiduously on a play, Prometheus portarore del fuoco (Prometheus the Fire-Bearer). Though never published in English, it was translated into Italian and published in Genoa in 1830, where it was reviewed enthusiastically. In typical fashion, Medwin dedicated the play to the memory of Shelley. Genoa, however, turned out to be only an interlude, as Medwin was expelled for writing a tragedy called The Conspiracy of the Fieschi, which alarmed the Genoese authorities, believing it to be anti-government propaganda. By January 1831 Medwin  was back in London, still hoping to earn a living as a writer.

Translating Aeschylus
In 1832 his Memoir of Shelley was published in six weekly instalments in The Athenaeum, with the Shelley Papers following at 18 weekly intervals until April 1833. These were collected in 1833 and published as The Shelley Papers; Memoir of Percy Bysshe Shelley. By that time Medwin was editor of the New Anti-Jacobin: A Monthly Magazine of Politics, Commerce, Science, Art, Music and the Drama, which appeared only twice, with contributions from the poet Horace Smith and John Poole, as well as the editor.

Medwin had also embarked on well-received translations of Aeschylus' plays into English. Prometheus Unbound and Agamemnon appeared in companion volumes in May 1833, followed by The Seven Tribes Against Thebes, The Persians, The Eumenides and The Choephori. He did not translate The Suppliants, apparently because he disapproved of "its corruptions". The translations were warmly reviewed by major literary magazines, including The Gentleman's Magazine, and published in Fraser's Magazine. Some criticised him for straying from the original meaning, which he had intentionally done, where he felt the occasion demanded. Medwin's skill lay in bringing alive Aeschylus's characters through believable dialogue that uses traditional metres and measure. 

Medwin's output in the middle years of the 1830s was extensive. He contributed a series of short stories to Bentley's Miscellany. He departed from his usual classical fare in The Angler in Wales or Days and Nights of Sportsmen, which is in the tradition of Isaac Walton's The Compleat Angler.  It defends the sport angling and provides insight into Medwin's love of the countryside and its pursuits. The publisher Richard Bentley contributed seventeen illustrations but decided that the submitted manuscript was not long enough for two volumes. This caused some tension between Medwin and Bentley as Medwin's funds were sparse. As a consequence additional material was added in the form of an appendix, made up of quotations from such works as Jan Swammerdam's  Ephemeri vita , a treatise on the mayfly The second volume was padded by a revised version of Medwin's Pidararees now called Julian and Giselle
Medwin's health was poor at this time as can be seen from correspondence with an unsympathetic Bentley now in the New York Library. In 1837 Medwin announced that he was moving to Heidelberg, in the Grand Duchy of Baden, Germany.

Heidelberg
In 1837–47 Medwin published 26 tales and sketches for publication in The Athenaeum and in other literary magazines. The prose he was now producing was essentially that of a traveller, with settings associated with former periods of his life: India, Rome, Switzerland, Paris, Venice, Florence and later Jena, Mannheim and Strasbourg. He became a de facto correspondent for successive magazines including The Athenaeum and The New Monthly Magazine providing impressions of all things German. He joined the influential Heidelberg museum and participated fully in the city's literary life, reviewing local theatre for English readers. He read the works of German poets including: Karl Gutzkow, Ludwig Tieck, Ludwig Achim von Arnim, Annette von Droste-Hülshoff, Rauch and Diefenbach. The poetry of the last he translated for English readers, as part of his contribution to cross-fertilisation of cultural relations between England and Germany. He lived in Heidelberg for most of the next twenty years, although travelling regularly to Baden-Baden, the setting for much of his only novel, Lady Singleton, published in 1842.

In Heidelberg he formed a deep attachment to the poet Caroline Champion de Crespigny (1797–1861), Their relationship was essentially intellectual, as neither could afford a divorce settlement from their estranged spouses. The English colony in Heidelberg was intimate. Medwin's acquaintances there included Mary and William Howitt, who found him a man of "culture and refinement, aristocratic in his tastes" whilst Charles Godfrey Leland, an American folklorist who befriended Medwin in Heidelberg describes Medwin as a kindly man 'full of anecdotes, which I now wish that I had recorded'.

In the early 1840s Lady Fanny Lindon, John Keats's former fiancée and literary muse, moved to Heidelberg with her husband, and through her Medwin was involved once again in a controversy concerning a dead, but highly influential English Romantic poet. Medwin and Lady Lindon collaborated to correct the allegation provided by Mary Shelley in her Essays, Letters from Abroad, Translations and Fragments (1840) that Keats had become insane in his final days. Lady Lindon showed Medwin letters that suggested otherwise. Medwin used this new information formation in his Life of Shelley, where he published extracts from letters by Keats and his friend Joseph Severn.

Life of Shelley
Medwin began his biography of Percy Shelley in 1845, corresponding with relatives and friends in England, including Percy Florence Shelley, the poet's son, and in 1846 requesting information from Mary Shelley. She was uncooperative, wishing to hinder  publication of the biography and claiming that Medwin had attempted to bribe her with the sum of £250. The work took two years to finish, appearing in September 1847. It was not a coolly dispassionate account of Shelley's life. It is passionate and opinionated, and includes attacks on Medwin's personal enemies. There are numerous errors of date, fact and quotation, some of the later outright bowdlerised. (Most of the errors were removed by Harry Buxton Forman in 1913.) Yet it remains a major source for the poet's early life and work. Medwin is the main source on the childhood of Shelley, a major source for the events of 1821–1822, and a mine of personal recollections. It was also the major source of knowledge in Germany of the life and work of Shelley, who since his death had become something of a divisive figure, and criticism was to be expected. Medwin's biography duly received a withering attack in The Athenaeum, which opened its review: "We are not in any way satisfied with this book." "The Spectator" wrote "Medwin's labours... are chiefly remarkable for the art of stuffing... nor does the author forget a scandal when he can pick any up." Medwin was even more strongly reviled by the surviving members of the Pisan circle. Mary Shelley's reaction was to be expected, given her antipathy towards him, but Trelawny was equally cutting, calling the work "superficial" as late as 1870. However, it was received better by some critics, including William Howitt and W. Harrison Ainsworth, who began their review in Howitt's Journal by saying the subject "could not possibly have fallen into more competent hands."

Medwin returned to Heidelberg from a visit to London and Horsham in time for the 1848 Revolution that swept through Germany. He and Caroline de Crespigny took flight to a more peaceable Weinsberg in Wurttemberg. He continued to work there, producing some poetry and translations for his host, Justinus Kerner, to whom in 1854 he published a poem. He returned to Heidelberg the same year and published a further poetry volume, The Nugae. This was international in content, with original poems and translations in Greek, Latin, English, and German. A further book of poetry published in 1862 in Heidelberg was entitled Odds and Ends, with translations from Catullus, Virgil, Horace and Scaliger, and additional poems by Caroline de Crespigny, who died shortly before its publication. The book confirmed that Thomas Medwin was a learned man, but prone to be imprecise and careless.

Final years

Medwin returned finally to England in 1865  and began rewriting his "Life of Shelley", although the revision exists only in handwritten form. In 1869 he was visited by his old friend and sometime rival Trelawny, who found him constant and "always faithful and honest in his love of Shelley."

Thomas Medwin died on 2 August 1869 at the house of his brother Pilfold Medwin (1794–1880) in the Carfax, Horsham, where he was buried in Denne Road Cemetery. At his request, his grave faces east to India, Italy and Germany, and reads: "He was a friend and companion of Byron, Shelley and Trelawny."

Legacy
Thomas Medwin's legacy tends to raise more questions than answers. His writings on Byron and Shelley are often imprecise and he had a tendency to fall out with former associates, including Shelley's widow and Trelawny.  These caveats aside he remains the main source of information on Shelley's childhood. His Conversations of Lord Byron is now seen generally as vivid and an essentially true picture of the man.

The few writers to highlight Medwin concentrate on his popular writings on Shelley and Byron, but his legacy includes numerous translations from Greek, Latin, Italian, German, Portuguese and Spanish. His translations of Aeschylus are of lasting importance and his early travel writings are vivid and memorable.His poetry remains neglected, with little critical comment available since their publication. His importance in the mid-19th-century cultural cross-currents between Britain, the United States and Germany has only recently been assessed. Medwin introduced many German writers to the English-speaking world, notably the poets Karl Gutzkow, Ludwig Tieck and Ludwig Achim von Arnim. He "deserves to be reassessed in the light of the new evidence that is now available."

Selected bibliography

Oswald and Edwin, an Oriental Sketch  (Geneva 1821)
Sketches in Hindoostan with Other Poems (London 1821)
Ahasuerus, The Wanderer; Dramatic Legend in Six Parts  (London 1823)
The Death of Mago translated from Petrarch's Africa; in Ugo Foscolo, Essays on Petrarch (London 1823) pp. 215 and 217
Journal of the Conversations of Lord Byron (Noted during a residence with his Lordship at Pisa, in the Years 1821 and 1822, London, 1824)
Prometheus Bound (translated from Aeschylus), Siena 1927; London 1832; Fraser's Magazine XVI (August 1837), pp. 209–233
Agamemnon (translated from Aeschylus), London 1832; Fraser's Magazine XVIII (November 1838), pp. 505–539
The Choephori (translated from Aeschylus), Fraser's Magazine VI, (London 1832), pp. 511–535
The Shelley Papers, Memoirs of Percy Bysshe Shelley (London, 1833)
The Persians (translated from Aeschylus), Fraser's Magazine VII (January 1833) pp. 17–43
The Seven Against Thebes (translated from Aeschylus), Fraser's Magazine VII (April 1833) pp. 437–458
The Eumenides (translated from Aeschylus), Fraser's Magazine IX (May 1834) pp. 553–573.
The Angler in Wales, or Days and Nights of Sportsmen (London 1834)
The apportionment of the world, from Schiller, translated by Thomas Medwin, Bentley's Miscellany IV p. 549 (December 1837)
The Three Sisters. A Romance of Real Life, Bentley's Miscellany III (January 1838)
The Two Sisters, Bentley's Miscellany III (March 1838)
Canova: Leaves from the Autiobiography of an Amateur, Frasers Magazine XX (September 1839)
 My Moustache, Ainsworth's Magazine, I, pp. 52–54 (1842)
Lady Singleton, or, The world as it is, Cunningham and Mortimer (London, 1843)
The Life of Percy Bysshe Shelley (London 1847)
Oscar and Gianetta: From the German of a Sonnetten Kranz, by Louis von Ploennies The New Monthly Magazine XCI (March 1851) pp. pp. 360–361
To Justinus Kerner: With a Painted Wreath of Bay-Leaves, The New Monthly Magazine XCI (November 1854) p. 196
Nugae (Heidelberg, 1856), edited by Medwin and including his own poems.
Odds and Ends (Heidelberg, 1862)
The Life of Percy Bysshe Shelley (London, 1913). A new edition, edited by H. Buxton Forman''

Biographies

Notes

References

1788 births
1869 deaths
19th-century English novelists
Alumni of University College, Oxford
People from Horsham
English male poets
Romantic poets
English translators
English biographers
English male novelists
19th-century English male writers
English male non-fiction writers
19th-century British translators
Male biographers